Recio may refer to:

 Lope Recio Loynaz (1860-1927), Cuban general
 Fernando Recio (born 1982), Spanish footballer
 Recio (footballer) (born 1991), Spanish footballer